Vasnetsov may refer to:

 Apollinary Vasnetsov (1856–1933), Russian painter
 Viktor Vasnetsov (1848–1926), Russian painter

Russian-language surnames